This is a list of functional analysis topics, by Wikipedia page.

See also: Glossary of functional analysis.

Hilbert space

Functional analysis, classic results

Operator theory

Banach space examples

Lp space
Hardy space
Sobolev space
Tsirelson space
ba space

Real and complex algebras

Topological vector spaces

Amenability

Amenable group
Von Neumann conjecture

Wavelets

Quantum theory
See also list of mathematical topics in quantum theory

Probability

Free probability
Bernstein's theorem

Non-linear

Fixed-point theorems in infinite-dimensional spaces

History

Stefan Banach (1892–1945)
Hugo Steinhaus (1887–1972)
John von Neumann (1903-1957)
Alain Connes (born 1947)
Earliest Known Uses of Some of the Words of Mathematics: Calculus & Analysis
Earliest Known Uses of Some of the Words of Mathematics: Matrices and Linear Algebra

Functional analysis